The Welsh Records Panel (WRP) checks and reports on rare bird records for Wales.

Assessment

The assessment of rare birds occurring in Wales is done through a three-tier process with the British Birds Rarities Committee checking reports of British rarities, the WRP checking reports of Welsh rarities and local records committees checking reports of species rare at the local level.

The WRP is a sub-committee of the Welsh Ornithological Society (WOS) and receives reports through bird recorders representing each of the Welsh counties and from individuals.

Reports

A rarities reporting form can be downloaded and completed from the WOS web site where regular reports are posted. They are also included in an annual Welsh Bird Report.

The WOS are building up a scarce and rare bird photo data base and are particularly interested in photos from the 1970s-1990s.

See also

List of birds of Wales

References

External links
 WRP Homepage

Ornithological checklists